Charcot-Marie-Tooth neuropathy, X-linked 2 (recessive) is a protein that in humans is encoded by the CMTX2 gene.

References

Further reading 

Human proteins